Helter Skelter is a 1992 rock opera by Fred Frith and François-Michel Pesenti. It was their first collaborative album and was recorded in Marseille, France, in February 1992. The music was composed by Frith, with libretto by Pesenti, and was conducted by Frith and Jean-Marc Montera. Frith and Pesenti do not perform on this album.

Background
In 1990, English multi-instrumentalist, composer and improvisor Fred Frith spent six months in Marseille, France, working with Que d'la Gueule, a group of young unemployed rock musicians. He composed Helter Skelter for them to perform, a rock opera for two sopranos, one contralto and a large electric ensemble. Their style of playing and abilities varied considerably, but Frith found that this was what contributed to the success of the project. He said, "Somehow all their personalities infected the kind of music we ended up making together." To add to the mix, Frith also encouraged them to create and play homemade instruments.

Helter Skelter was billed as an "operatic tragedy", and was first performed in December 1990 at Theatre Toursky in Marseille. Later the work was also performed in Zagreb, Hamburg, St. Brieuc and Paris. The opera was recorded in February 1992 by Christian Noêl at Studio Cactus in Marseille, and later mixed in July 1992 by Benedykt Grodon, Fred Frith and Jean-Marc Montera at Sound Fabrik in Munich using additional material taken from concert performances.

Reception
In his book Plunderphonics, 'pataphysics & pop mechanics: an introduction to musique actuelle, Andrew Jones said that Que d'la Gueule "show themselves to be a powerful ensemble bristling with talent and volatile contradictions", and that in Helter Skelter they "sketch a broad canvas of despair and hope, an urban maelstrom with moments of pure beauty peering through the shards of electroacoustic reality." Jones added that "Listening to [the opera] is like a ride on a subway and a stroll through a bustling market while listening to music on a walkman: striated fragments upon fragments leak through, from Eastern European jigs and dances …, samples of street life, radio broadcasts, plaintive chords arising from the horns, a soprano singer launching into Catalani's La Romance, all layered in an astonishing dense, chaotic mix and anchored by two airtight drummers."

Track listing
Music by Fred Frith, lyrics by François-Michel Pesenti.

Source: Discogs, liner notes

Personnel
Fred Frith – conductor
Jean-Marc Montera – conductor
Dalila Khatir (:fr:Dalila Khatir) – soprano vocals
Danielle Stephan – soprano vocals
Frederique Wolf-Michaux – contralto vocals

Que d'la Gueule
Claude Monteil – soprano saxophone, tuyaux
Edmond Hosdikian – alto saxophone, tenor saxophone
Fred Giuliani – samples, klavier
Kiwi – electric piano, analog synthesizer
Nadine Laporte – digital synthesizer
Richard Peter – electric guitar
Christophe Costabel – electric guitar
Laurent Luci – electric guitar
Farid Khenfouf – electric bass
Denis Cabacho – metal percussions, harmonica, newspapers
Jean-Christophe Ville – 1-string banjo, melodica, chains, food
Didier Roth – home-made instruments, tapes, radio, lungs
Ahmed Compaore – drums
Mathias Mopty – drums
Source: Discogs, liner notes

Production
Recorded February 1992 by Christian Noêl at Studio Cactus, Marseille
Mixed July 1992 by Benedykt Grodon, Fred Frith and Jean-Marc Montera at Sound Fabrik, Munich using additional material taken from performances in Zagreb, Hamburg, St. Brieuc and Paris
Digital editing by Andy Fuchs at Silent Movie Music, Munich
Produced by Fred Frith
Liner notes by Gabriel Vialle
Photography by Heike Liss
Design by Peter Bäder
Source: Discogs, liner notes

References

Works cited

External links

1992 debut albums
Experimental music albums
French-language albums
RecRec Music albums
Fred Frith albums
Albums produced by Fred Frith
Collaborative albums